Peats, an electoral district of the Legislative Assembly in the Australian state of New South Wales, existed from 1973 until its abolition in 2007 and was always held by the Labor party.


Members

Election results

Elections in the 2000s

2003

Elections in the 1990s

1999

1995

1991

Elections in the 1980s

1988

1985 by-election

1984

1981

Elections in the 1970s

1978

1976

1973

References

New South Wales state electoral results by district